A Day in the Dirt Motocross Grand Prix is an annual motocross event held on Thanksgiving weekend, in California, United States. The races are notable for their participants, ranging from Hollywood film and stunt industry professionals like Mike "Mouse" McCoy and Alisa Hensley-Lane, to racing legends such as Ricky Johnson, Jeff Ward, Ron Lechein, Jeremy McGrath, J.N. Roberts, Eric Kehoe, Eddie Mulder, Mike Kiedrrowski, Ryan Hughes, Jeff Emig, Broc Glover, Mike Bell, Micky Dymond, and John DeSoto. The races also attract extreme sports celebrities such as Ronnie Renner, Henry Wiles, Robie and Bret Peterson, Shaun Palmer, Dave Mirra, Mike Metzler, and Alexander Smith.

"A Day in the Dirt" was created by Kenny Alexander, and fellow stuntman Jimmy Roberts. The race was inspired by actor and motorcycle racer Steve McQueen, and the proceeds from practice sessions go to the Steve McQueen Memorial fund for Boys Republic.

Roberts' and Alexander's fathers were members of the Viewfinders, an off-road motorcycle club formed in the early days of desert racing by stuntmen in the motion picture industry. Jimmy Roberts is a Hollywood stuntman who has worked on notable films such as M:I-2, The Fast and the Furious and Paycheck. A documentary about "A Day in the Dirt" was produced by Kenny Alexander. Actor Mark-Paul Gosselaar, narrated the film, which is shot at the 2002 "A Day in the Dirt Motocross Grand Prix." Stuntman Mike "Mouse" McCoy is featured in the film, "joining forces and competing with top athletes for bragging rights at the finish line."

References

External links 
 A Day in the Dirt MotoCross Grand Prix official website

Motocross
Motorcycle races in the United States